The Sea Bird 37 MS is a Canadian sailboat that was designed by Stan Huntingford, Hardin International and Cooper Enterprises as a motorsailer and first built in 1973.

The Sea Bird 37 MS is a development of the Sea Bird 37.

Production
The design was built by Cooper Enterprises in Port Coquitlam, British Columbia, starting in 1973, but the company went out of business in 1990 and it is now out of production.

Design
The Sea Bird 37 MS uses the same hull as the Sea Bird 37, but with a new deck incorporating a pilothouse designed by Forbes Cooper.

The design is a recreational keelboat, built predominantly of fibreglass, with wood trim. It has a masthead sloop rig, a raked stem, a nearly-plumb transom, a keel-hung rudder controlled by two wheels and a fixed long keel. One wheel is located in the open, aft cockpit and the other on the starboard side of the enclosed pilothouse. The boat displaces  and carries  of ballast.

The design has sleeping accommodation for five people, with a double "V"-berth in the bow cabin, a straight settee in the main cabin and an aft  double settee berth on the port side in the pilothouse. The galley is located on the port side amidships. The galley is "U"-shaped and is equipped with a three-burner stove, an ice box and a sink. The pilothouse has a navigation and helm station on the starboard side. The head is located just aft of the bow cabin on the port side.

Operational history
In a 1984 review in Yachting magazine, writer Chris Caswell described the design as, "the purest motorsailer from this company".

See also
List of sailing boat types

References

Keelboats
1970s sailboat type designs
Sailing yachts 
Motorsailers
Sailboat type designs by Stan Huntingford
Sailboat types built by Cooper Enterprises